The 1991 Virginia Slims of Chicago was a women's tennis tournament played on indoor carpet courts at the UIC Pavilion in Chicago, Illinois in the United States and was part of the Tier II  category of the 1991 WTA Tour. It was the 20th edition of the tournament and was held from February 11 through February 17, 1991. First-seeded Martina Navratilova won the singles title, her 11th at the event and earned $70,000 first-prize money as well as 300 ranking points.

Finals

Singles
 Martina Navratilova defeated  Zina Garrison-Jackson 6–1, 6–2
 It was Navratilova's 1st singles title of the year and the 153rd of her career.

Doubles
 Gigi Fernández /  Jana Novotná defeated  Martina Navratilova /  Pam Shriver 6–2, 6–4

References

External links
 ITF tournament edition details
 Tournament draws

Virginia Slims of Chicago
Ameritech Cup
Virginia Slims of Chicago
Virginia Slims of Chicago
Virginia Slims of Chicago